Leo Sterckx (16 July 1936 – 4 March 2023) was a Belgian cyclist. He competed for Belgium at the 1960 Summer Olympics held in Rome, Italy in the individual sprint event where he finished in second place.

Sterckx died on 4 March 2023, at the age of 86.

References

1936 births
2023 deaths
Belgian male cyclists
Olympic cyclists of Belgium
Olympic silver medalists for Belgium
Cyclists at the 1960 Summer Olympics
Olympic medalists in cycling
Cyclists from Antwerp
Medalists at the 1960 Summer Olympics
20th-century Belgian people